Merocoris curtatus is a species of leaf-footed bug in the family Coreidae. It is found in North America.

References

Further reading

 
 
 
 
 
 

Insects described in 1919
Meropachyinae